Gosainganj may refer to:

 Gosainganj, Lucknow
 Gosainganj, Faizabad
 Goshainganj (Assembly constituency)